Brattan is a surname. Notable people with the surname include:

 Jack Brattan (1931–2010), Irish football player
 Joshua Brattan (died 1838), American politician
 Luke Brattan (born 1990), Australian football player
 Robert Franklin Brattan (1845–1894), American politician and lawyer

See also
Bratton (surname)